Aniek van Koot defeated Sabine Ellerbrock in the final, 3–6, 6–2, 7–6 (7–3) to win the women's singles wheelchair tennis title at the 2013 US Open.

Esther Vergeer was the six-time reigning champion from when the event was last held in 2011, not being held in 2012 due to a schedule conflict with the 2012 Summer Paralympics. However, Vergeer retired from professional wheelchair tennis in February 2013. Since Vergeer had won every edition of the event since its creation in 2005, a new US Open singles champion was guaranteed.

Seeds
 Sabine Ellerbrock (final)
 Aniek van Koot (champion)

Draw

Finals

External links 
 Main Draw

Wheelchair Women's Singles
U.S. Open, 2013 Women's Singles